Jean-Louis Pelletier (30 March 1936 – 11 October 2022) was a French criminal lawyer.

Biography
Pelletier began his career in Aix-en-Provence, where his clients twice received death penalty verdicts. He also obtained two Presidential pardons for his clients, one from Charles de Gaulle in 1965 and one from François Mitterrand in 1981.

Pelletier mentored many younger members of the bar, such as Éric Dupond-Moretti. He presided over the Association des avocats pénalistes.

Jean-Louis Pelletier died on 11 October 2022.

Books
Un certain sentiment d'injustice (1989)
Profession : avocat.... de Mesrine à l'affaire d'Outreau (2012)

References

1936 births
2022 deaths
French criminal law
French lawyers
People from Hyères